Tamara Kumari Ilangaratne ( Aludeniya; 15 March 1925 – 5 October 2000) was a Ceylonese politician. She was the third female member to be elected to parliament in Sri Lanka (formerly Ceylon). 

Ilangaratne was elected as the independent representative for Kandy in parliamentary by-election held on 18 June 1949, where she polled 10,062 votes (50.75% of the total vote) succeeding her husband T. B. Ilangaratne who had been unseated in an election petition and striped of his civic rights. At the 2nd parliamentary elections in 1952, she failed to retain her seat, losing to the United National Party (UNP) candidate, E. L. Senanayake who received 11,349 votes (58.45%) as opposed to Ilangaratne's 7,644 votes (39.37%).

In 1965 Ilangaratne contested the seat of Galagedara at the 6th parliamentary elections, representing the Sri Lanka Freedom Party. She was narrowly beaten by the UNP candidate, W. M. G. T. Banda, by 574 votes. She was however successful at the subsequent parliamentary elections in 1970 defeating W. M. G. T. Banda, by 2,560 votes (securing 55% of the total vote). At the 1977 parliamentary elections she lost the seat to W. M. G. T. Banda, by 5,873 votes.

On September 4, 1944, she married T. B. Ilangaratne, a government clerk, who entered politics as a socialist and became senior government minister.

Ilangaratne died on 5 October 2000, at the age of 75.

References

1925 births
2000 deaths
Members of the 1st Parliament of Ceylon
Members of the 7th Parliament of Ceylon
Sri Lanka Freedom Party politicians